Onorato may refer to:

Given name 
Onorato Caetani (1842–1917), Italian politician from the noble Caetani-family
Onorato Caetani (1742–1797), Italian scholar
Onorato Candiota (...- after 1808), Italian philosopher
Onorato Carlandi (1848–1939), Italian painter
Onorato Damen (1893–1979), Italian communist
Onorato I Caetani (c. 1336–1400), Italian nobleman
Onorato Nicoletti (1872–1929), Italian mathematician
Onorato Onorati, Italian Roman Catholic bishop

Surname 
Dan Onorato (born 1961), American Democratic politician
George Onorato (1928–2015), American politician
Giovanni Onorato (1910–1960), Italian film actor
Glauco Onorato (1936–2009), Italian actor and voice actor
Marco Onorato (1953–2012), Italian cinematographer
Ronald J. Onorato, American architectural historian and professor of Art History and Chair
Vincenzo Onorato (born 1957), Italian sailor